

This is a list of the National Register of Historic Places listings in Lafayette County, Missouri.

This is intended to be a complete list of the properties and districts on the National Register of Historic Places in Lafayette County, Missouri, United States. Latitude and longitude coordinates are provided for many National Register properties and districts; these locations may be seen together in a map.

There are 32 properties and districts listed on the National Register in the county.

Current listings

|}

See also
 List of National Historic Landmarks in Missouri
 National Register of Historic Places listings in Missouri

References

 
Lafayette